This is a list of characters featured in the Disney Channel animated series The Owl House, created by Dana Terrace.

Main

Luz Noceda

Luz Noceda (voiced by Sarah-Nicole Robles) is a 14-year-old Afro-Dominican-American girl from Gravesfield, Connecticut who ends up on the Boiling Isles, and becomes both Eda's apprentice and a new exchange student at Hexside Academy. She often feels as though she does not fit in, which accumulates into instilling a poor amount of self-worth when she directly or indirectly messes up and a strong desire to be seen as special and valued, and it's implied that her low self-esteem resulted in her obtaining a guilt and martyr complex. Luz loves all things fantasy and magical, wanting to become a witch. She finds out that she can use magic by drawing glyphs that she sees within her environment and spell circles witches cast to do magic. She finally became an official student of Hexside, though she was disappointed upon finding out students were not allowed to study more than one type of magic. Later, however, with the help of the detention track students, Luz saves the school from a magic-eating Greater Basilisk who had disguised herself as the Emperor's Coven inspector. Principal Bump was convinced that mixing magic is not a bad thing, and therefore let the other trouble-making students study more than one track, with Luz becoming the first student officially allowed to learn magic from all the tracks. At the end of season one, Luz is forced to destroy her only way home to protect it from being invaded by Emperor Belos.  In season two, Luz begins teaching Eda and Lilith to use glyph magic as she searches for a way home. Unbeknownst to her, there is a doppelgänger posing as her while living with her oblivious mother Camila. She also begins to realize that her former rival Amity Blight has crush on her, with the two of them becoming a couple in "Knock, Knock, Knockin' on Hooty's Door". Luz eventually uses a portal to see her mother; during which she discovers that an opportunistic, yet kind basilisk named Vee was posing as her. After convincing her mother to look after her, Luz accidentally gives the impression that she wanted to get away from her and watches helplessly as she is forced back to the Boiling Isles; promising that she will be back and stay. Luz eventually tells Eda and King but neglects to bring this up to anyone else until Amity finds her cell phone and asks her what is happening with her. In "Reaching Out", it is revealed that her father passed away when she was young and she annually collects flowers to remember him. Luz later enacts a plan to help disrupt the Day of Unity that involves allowing herself to be captured by Kikimora while disguised as Hunter using Gus's illusions. Luz manages to stop the Day of Unity, but in the process is forced to leave King and Eda behind in the Demon Realm and returns to the Human Realm with Amity, Gus, Willow, and Hunter where she reunites with her mother. She eventually returns where she finally gains a palismen in the form of a "snake shifter" which she names Stringbean. 

According to Dana Terrace, Luz is named after her Dominican-American roommate, Luz Batista, a story consultant for the show, and is Disney's first confirmed bisexual lead character, a trait that she had to fight for.

Eda Clawthorne
Edalyn "Eda" Clawthorne (voiced by Wendie Malick as an adult, Dee Bradley Baker in owl beast form, Natalie Palamides as a young girl), also known as "The Owl Lady", is the self-proclaimed most powerful witch on the Boiling Isles, and Luz's mentor. A reward has been offered for her capture, due to her criminal record, which includes offenses such as selling human items, not joining a coven, and theft. Whilst Eda's approach to teaching is often chaotic and uncoordinated, she has a deeper understanding of magic than she lets on, is able to effectively perform powerful spells, and her approach is ultimately instrumental in Luz discovering her own magic. Eda attended Hexside School of Magic and Demonics when she was younger, but now happily despises the school. Whilst she is pleased to see Luz banned from campus following an incident, she relents upon realizing that Luz wants more knowledge, and makes a deal with Principal Bump to allow Luz to attend classes, admitting that she cares about Luz and wants to make her happy. Eda initially claims she was called The Owl Lady because of her home and possessing traits similar to owls, but it is later revealed to be due to a curse that causes her to turn into an owl beast, and she must drink an elixir daily to suppress the curse. Over the course of season one the elixir begins to lose its potency on her, and it becomes progressively harder for her to keep the transformation at bay. Eda's relationship with her sister Lilith is complicated, and while they clearly care about one another, Eda is resistant to wanting to work with her under the Emperor's Coven and openly fights with Lilith to retain her freedom. It is later revealed that Eda, in fact, wanted to join the coven, but was willing to give it up once she saw that Lilith wanted it. Ironically, it is revealed that Eda was cursed by Lilith when they fought for the position and she had been working to try and break the curse. They make up as Eda's condition worsens, and Lilith decides to share the burden of Eda's curse, lessening its effects but greatly weakening both their magic in the process, and giving them both two different colored eyes.  

In season two, Eda begins to deal with the fact that she is no longer all-powerful and initially struggles to earn money for the Owl House. With Luz's help, they manage to secure Selkigris (essentially golden vomit) and are fiscally secure. In "Echoes of the Past", it is revealed that Eda found King when he was just a baby, took him in, and practically raised him. Eda was the one who convinced King that he was the King of Demons, although that was unintentional on her part. In "Keeping up A-fear-ances", she is reunited with her mother Gwendolyn and makes amends after making her realize that she has been using holistic medicine to hide the shame of her curse. She is also reunited with fellow witch and head of the Bard Coven Raine Whispers, her ex-partner for whom she is implied to still have feelings. In "Knock, Knock, Knockin' on Hooty's Door", Eda comes to the realization that her fear of her curse has caused her to push those close to her away. Confronting her owl-beast side in her dreams, she makes a truce with it, and gains the ability to transform into a harpy-like owl-creature. When the Day of Unity arrives, Eda allows herself to be branded with a Bard sigil by the rebel group Covens Against the Throne (also known as the CATS) so that she can sneak in and disrupt the ceremony. When the plan fails, Raine pulls off Eda's sigil-branded arm so that she would not be subjected to the spell. 

Malick compared the character to previous roles in her career, "When I saw Eda I immediately went 'oh, that's my girl'... she even dresses a little bit like Nina Van Horn from Just Shoot Me!... I love her dress, I love her tooth... I just fell in love with her the second I saw her".

King
King Clawthorne (voiced by Alex Hirsch as his current form, Dana Terrace as a baby and "squeak of rage" effects) is a small, approximately and implicitly to be 8 or 9-year-old Titan with a skull-like head and Eda's roommate who is the self-proclaimed "King of Demons". While it is not known if he truly is the King of Demons, he certainly retains an overly confident and domineering attitude that implies that he once held some greatness. He was initially frightened of Luz when he first met her but warmed up to her appearance when she helped him. While she continues to coddle him, King wants to be seen as "cool" and claims to have vast knowledge of all monsters and demons, though some of it might be based on his own false presumptions. Regardless, he is willing to acknowledge it if it was incorrect. His relationship with Eda ranges from two casual roommates to a child and his mother. While he is quick to poke fun at her, he cares about her and wanted to help repress her curse. King is shown to be bossy and manipulative, but ultimately shows his heroic and caring side whenever he and his friends are in danger. His ultimate goal is to obtain followers and have absolute power. This results in him finding himself in ludicrous situations such as bringing dolls to life to do his bidding, becoming a teacher at Hexside, and using Eda in her monster form to rule a playground. All efforts usually result in him losing this "power" and things going back to normal. Despite his rambunctious nature, he begins to act more dog-like around Luz and openly misses her whenever she goes out to Hexside or hangs out with someone other than him.  In season two, King's origins begin to be revealed. In the episode "Echoes of the Past", King is revealed to not actually have been the king of demons. He was an infant found by Eda who playfully convinced him that he ruled over all. He discovered that he had just hatched from his egg and was supposed to be watched over by a strange amorphous creature that Eda managed to evade. Believing that his father was someone important, he has Luz reattach his horn to his head with glue so that he can retain as much of his memories as he can to look for his father. In "Eda's Requiem", he legally gets adopted by Eda and changes his name to King Clawthorne. In "Knock, Knock, Knockin' on Hooty's Door", King discovers that he can produce an echoing blast after admitting that he is upset about his father leaving him. In "Edge of the World", it is revealed that King himself is a Titan. This news affects him emotionally and he begins to question his goals. It is only through a meeting with former Coven Guard Steve that he begins to accept himself. King ends up stopping the Day of Unity by releasing the Collector, learning his father sealed the being away. King then sends Luz and her friends away to the Human Realm to protect them from the Collector.

Hooty
Hooty (voiced by Alex Hirsch) is the witty house demon (as he is classified by Patch in "Hooty's Moving Hassle" and in "Agony of a Witch" by Lilith) of the titular house. Themed after a barn owl (with giant legs that he can walk around with when given the power to, à la Baba Yaga's hut), he uses the owl-headed doorknocker to interact with the world around him by stretching his neck to allegedly infinite lengths; he tends to act surreal, awkward, and/or annoying, though this often results in comedic moments for the audience to view. Often, his odd behavior happens when no one is in the house. Despite all this, he is fully capable of taking care of himself as he can reliably attack with his neck. Hooty sometimes has a habit of wanting to be seen as enigmatic or mysterious. He does this by trying to pose riddles to people including Eda, but this usually results in him getting injured. Apparently, he feels everything affecting the house itself and at one point, his door was ripped off, causing him to become unconscious, complete with x eyes. However, by the end of the episode, he is returned and fully conscious. In season two, Hooty begins to warm up to Lilith (In "Separate Tides", the first episode of season two, she initially referred to him as a "Bird worm") and aims to become her friend. He manages to earn her respect when he helps her secure fire bee honey (though he gets stung in the process) and begins to affectionately call her Lulu while she calls him "Hootcifer" (a play on Lucifer). In "Echoes of the Past", Hooty is revealed to have the ability to remove himself from the door and reinsert himself into other objects. The process of him physically doing this is not shown, but it is enough to disgust Luz, Lilith, and King. Hooty later becomes distraught when Lilith decides to leave the Owl House. However, he becomes a more supportive figure in his friends' lives as he manages to help King, Eda, and Luz embrace their fears and move forward. During his time with King, Hooty stated that he is under the Bug Demon classification. In "Follies at the Coven Day Parade", it is revealed that he is capable of removing his skin to reveal his skeleton.

Supporting

Willow Park
Willow Park (voiced by Tati Gabrielle) is a student at Hexside and Luz, Amity, Gus and Hunter's friend who is skilled with plant magic. Originally, Willow was placed in the Abomination Track due to her parents' wishes. She was terrible at performing on this track, which caused much bullying from her classmates, who would call her "Half-a-Witch Willow". Upon meeting Luz for the first time, the two attempted to improve her image, which works up to a certain point. Eventually, Willow was forced to use her plant magic to save Luz, which upon being viewed by Principal Bump, allowed her to transfer to the Plant Track. Since then, Willow has grown from a shy and insecure girl to a confident and even level-headed individual who tends to act as the voice of reason to Luz's eccentricity and Gus' over-confidence. It is revealed that she and Amity used to be close friends since childhood, but due to Amity's parents not wanting to associate with her due to her lack of magic, Amity was forced to cut ties with her, which brought a misery between her and Amity. Willow eventually learns this in "Understanding Willow" and forgives Amity, starting to rekindle their friendship. In that same episode, Willow is shown to have two fathers named Gilbert and Harvey Park. In "Wing It Like Witches", Willow's newfound confidence has earned her some respect at Hexside, though some students like Boscha still pick on her. She shows considerable restraint, as while she wanted to use the Green Thumb Gauntlet to expand her plant abilities, she immediately returned it uttering "I just wanted to try it out," though she still used it later to help Luz. In season two, Willow is nearly expelled, an event that shocks her fathers. While Harvey is shown to be very protective and studious, Gilbert secretly allows her to escape to help her friends. In "Hunting Palismen", Willow gets her own staff and palisman in the form of a bee named Clover. In "Any Sport in a Storm", she starts a Flying Derby team with Gus, Skara, Viney, and an incognito Hunter. Despite the latter's betrayal, he reforms and rescues his friends, as Willow becomes more appreciative of him. At the end of "King's Tide", Willow flees to the human realm with Luz, Amity, Gus and Hunter. She eventually returns where she finally faces Boscha for all the years of being bullied and overcomes her self-doubt with the help of Hunter, whom she is implied to now have a crush on.

Gus Porter
Augustus "Gus" Porter (voiced by Issac Ryan Brown) is a student at Hexside and Luz, Amity, Willow and Hunter's friend who is skilled in illusion magic and is part of the Illusion Track. He has an obsession with human culture and was amazed when he first met Luz. Completely oblivious to common human norms, such as high fiving and even nicknames, he quickly took to being called Gus for short after Luz told him that she knew someone with a similar name. Since then, Gus has been a prominent friend to Luz, usually taking part in many of the magical shenanigans that they get caught up in. He is well-gifted in illusion casting, to the point that he freely moves about the campus while his illusion clone sits in for classes. He was moved up a couple of grades, explaining why he is noticeably younger than Luz and Willow. He was the president of the Human Appreciation Society (H.A.S.), but in a misled effort to retain his title, he lied to Luz about having lifted her ban from the school; leading to them getting into more trouble. He ultimately comes clean, but loses his place as president of H.A.S. Gus is self-assertive, but also looking for the approval of others. Nevertheless, he is very confident and does not seem afraid of speaking his mind on things. When using the oracle sphere to show his "best self", his illusion clone informs him that he is "always [his] best self", news that causes him to weep in satisfaction. His father Perry is a news reporter for BBN-HXN.  In season two, Gus is shown to have slightly aged, which according to him is "witch puberty". He also begins to hone his illusion abilities when he aids an illusion master known as the Keeper of the Looking Glass Ruins. In "Hunting Palismen", Gus gets his own staff and palisman in the form of a blue chameleon named Emmiline Bailey Marcostimo. Gus joins Willow's Flying Derby team and befriends Hunter, despite his attempt to betray them. In "Labyrinth Runners", Gus is shown to have had trouble making friends as everyone takes advantage of his intellect. Willow became his first friend and taught him a breathing technique, which Gus later shares with Hunter. His illusionary abilities are also revealed to be rather powerful but can become untamed if he is stressed or upset. He befriends Hunter who becomes another genuine friend. At the end of "King's Tide", Gus flees to the human realm with Luz, Amity, Willow and Hunter. He eventually returns along with Luz and the rest of the gang to help defeat the Collector.

Amity Blight
Amity Blight (voiced by Mae Whitman) is a student at Hexside and Luz's girlfriend, Willow and Gus' friend who is an abomination expert and also works part-time at the Bonesborough Library. Upon first meeting, Amity appears to be a snooty, entitled, hypocritical, egocentric, arrogant, petty, and cold-hearted top student who bullies, demeans, and looks down on those she feels are inferior to her. She is finally put in her place when Luz arrives and her presence unintentionally makes her lose her cool in front of her teacher and Principal Bump and loses her top student title when she nearly gets Luz killed in the process of retrieving it, effectively wounding her pride. In her next appearance, she began to hold severe disdain towards Luz, blaming her for getting her in trouble, mocks her dream of becoming a witch, and hurts King's feelings. This leads to Luz to impetuously challenge her to a witches' duel which will determine whether Luz should continue witch training. However, when Amity is exposed to accidental cheating on Lilith’s part, she runs off embarrassed and lashes out at Luz, accusing her for supposedly humiliating her in front of the Emperor's Coven and for embarrassing her at school, while lamenting how much pressure she puts on herself to be the best, but she is surprised to see that Luz shows kindness while trying to comfort her and allows her to continue magic training. Amity slowly begins to show a sentimental side, even though she still acts hostile towards her, she claims that she is trying to understand Luz, albeit without actually trying to talk to her, listen to her perspective, or admit her own faults and take responsibility for her actions, and is revealed to constantly get picked on by her older siblings Emira and Edric. Eventually, despite her consistent rudeness and disrespectful behavior toward Luz, and even going as far as to hypocritically call her a bully, Amity starts to become fascinated with her desire to be friends, and after a night of peril with her at the library, they make up and bond over their shared love of The Good Witch Azura. This leads Amity to finally realize that Luz never meant any harm and that she never actually took the time to get to know Luz as a person, realizing her own horrible attitude was not helping, and thus deciding to reflect on her earlier harmful, hurtful and antagonistic behavior. From that point on, Amity's personality changes from slight indifference to genuine friendliness, yet displays nervousness when wanting to talk to Luz. Also thanks to Luz's emotional support, she makes amends with Willow, admitting that her distancing was due to her parents' influence and not being good enough to stand up for herself and apologizing for all the harm she has done to her, allowing the two of them to start rekindle their friendship. Amity is later revealed to have a crush on Luz, to the point that she now gets nervous whenever she gets close to her.  

In season two, Amity is more welcoming to Luz and her friends and appears more in control of her emotions around her. However, she is put upon by her parents when they expel them from Hexside for being a "bad influence" on her. But when they put Luz in danger when she tries to get her and her friends back into school, she finally confronts her parents and gets them back into Hexside. She acknowledges that Luz's arrival changed her for the better and redyes her hair lilac because her former green-dyed hair was mostly liked by her mother. She also confirms her feelings for Luz by kissing her on the cheek, though she is later embarrassed by this. In "Knock, Knock, Knockin' on Hooty's Door", the two of them officially become a couple. In "Eclipse Lake", Amity has her own staff and palisman in the form of a cat named Ghost. In "Reaching Out", she finally tells Alador that her joining the Emperor's Coven was Odalia's dream and was never what Amity actually wanted, she doesn't want to join any coven and that she is dating Luz. In "Clouds on the Horizon", Amity disowns her mother after learning that she is in on Belos' Day of Unity plans. At the end of "King's Tide", Amity flees to the human realm with Luz, Willow, Gus and Hunter. She eventually returns where she discovers that Boscha obsessively misses her, but she finally cuts her out of her life. 

Amity is the first major animated Disney character to be a confirmed lesbian.

Hunter
Hunter (voiced by Zeno Robinson) is an arrogant and difficult-to-get along with teen who was the current Golden Guard, taken in by Belos as his nephew and enforcer. In reality, Hunter is the latest in a series of grimwalkers, clones that Belos created in the image of his brother whom he is implied to have killed for falling in love with a witch. While easygoing and practical despite being imposing and mischievous, Hunter is a prodigy in magic who became head of the Emperor's Coven after Lilith defected. Hunter later visits Blight Industries to purchase all the Abomatons for Belos' army as he states that Belos dislikes anyone establishing an unauthorized private army. In "Hunting Palismen", Hunter developed an interest in wild magic and assume it could cure Belos despite his insistence that wild magic is what caused their family's downfall. He ends up amicably working with Luz after Kikimora tries to kill him when he is sent to gather palismen. While desperate to seek Belos' approval, he is ultimately won over by Luz into doing the right thing and lets Luz leave with the palismen. Afterwards, Hunter gets his own staff and palisman in the form of a cardinal called Flapjack, after risking his job for them. While still devoted to Belos to an almost obsessive degree, he does show genuine gratitude and compassion, implying that he is softening due to his palisman. He attempts to force Willow and her Flying Derby team to join the Emperor's Coven to prove himself to Darius. Upon realizing that what he is doing is wrong, he rescues them and ends up earning his respect. Upon finding out, Darius tells Hunter that he is proud that he has made friends his age. Afterwards, he starts to act as Luz's (unwilling) informant within the Emperor's Coven. In "Hollow Mind", Hunter is accidentally transported into Belos' mindscape along with Luz, resulting in him seeing his "uncle"'s true colors first-hand. Despite his initial denial and justification of Belos' real nature and horrible actions, Hunter's devotion to Belos is completely shattered upon learning his true origin along with the truth behind Belos' goals. Hunter flees for his life soon after in fear that Belos would kill him like his predecessors over defying him, taking refuge in Hexside where he forms an unlikely friendship with Gus while telling the truth behind the Day of Unity to the students and facility. At the end of "King's Tide", Hunter is stranded the Human Realm with Luz, Amity, Willow and Gus. He finds himself comfortable in the Human Realm, discovering new interests and an improved sense of self. However, he ends up possessed by what remains of Belos, attacking the others and nearly dying before Flapjack saves him by sacrificing himself. After Flapjack's sacrifice, Hunter gains new scars and his eyes change to brown. Upon returning to the Boiling Isles, he becomes defensive and struggles with his grief over his palisman, but manages to help Willow (who he is implied to have a mutual crush on) with her insecurities. In doing that, he discovers he now has the ability to teleport thanks to Flapjack.

Lilith Clawthorne
Lilith Clawthorne (voiced by Cissy Jones as an adult, Abigail Zoe Lewis as a teen, Dee Bradley Baker in owl beast form) is Eda's estranged older sister and, until the end of season one, leader of the Emperor's Coven. Lilith and Eda have a strained relationship, with Lilith insisting on coming with her to see Emperor Belos. She gets humiliated time and time again by Eda, who stymies her at every turn. It was greatly implied that she had genuinely good motives for wanting to have Eda come with her when she unknowingly admits to Luz that Eda wanted to join the Emperor's Coven when she was little. Despite their tense relationship, the two of them do express longing for some kind of reconciliation. In "Agony of a Witch", it is revealed that she is the one who cursed Eda to turn into the owl monster when they were young, as she was envious of her magical talent and immeasurable power. This led to Lilith's deal with Emperor Belos after she felt guilty for what she did to her sister. Following Luz's duel with Emperor Belos, Lilith betrays the Emperor to help Luz and uses her magic to split the curse with Eda, resulting in the two of them getting matching split colored eyes.  In season two, Lilith begins living in the Owl House and has been trying to make amends with her sister. She creates a spell that will allow them to spy into the Emperor's Coven and in the process ends up befriending Hooty, whom she affectionately begins calling "Hootcifer". When she makes a special window to spy on Emperor Belos, Lilith is unaware that Belos has sensed this new window. In "Keeping up A-fear-ances", Lilith is revealed to have been ignored by her mother, Gwendolyn, for most of her life. Upon her realizing this, they make amends. Lilith decides to leave the Owl House and move back in with her parents. Later, it is shown that she got a job as the assistant curator at the Supernatural Museum of History. She also tries to take on a more confident attitude to be like Eda and impress Luz, with whom she now shares an aunt-niece relationship. She later returns to the Owl House upon receiving word of the Day of Unity's true results and is now working with her sister and friends to prevent it. In "O Titan, Where Art Thou", Lilith is shown to be obsessively devoted to perceived authority figures to the point that she disregards other people's feelings. Upon seeing how organized everyone else is within the Emperor's Coven, particularly those who are against it, she begins to realize that she may not have been good at her job. Following the Collector's takeover, she manages keep herself alive and tries to concoct a spell that will free everyone from the Collector's spells. Lilith is confirmed to be aromantic and asexual.

Hieronymus Bump
Hieronymus Bump (voiced by Bumper Robinson) is the principal of Hexside School of Magic and Demonics who wears a demon-shaped hat over half his face. At first glance, he seems rather imposing and possibly sinister. However, he is simply pressed upon by his job as the school principal about his work. He is also seen to be quite reasonable when it comes to changing his mind, and ultimately is open-minded despite occasional stubbornness and morally questionable actions, like when he tried to dissect Luz for trespassing while masquerading as an abomination. In light of Luz being at the school posing as an Abomination, Principal Bump had enlisted trouble-smelling creatures to act as the school's security staff where they were thrown in the detention room where the worms inside the trap the students in correctional crystals and brainwash them into behaving better. He has a terse relationship with Eda Clawthorne, whom he has kept a notorious record of during her time at Hexside. The only reason why Bump allowed Luz to attend is that he gleefully roped Eda into cleaning up all the messes she made while she was at Hexside. Bump agreed with Eda to keep quiet to the Emperor's Coven about their deal. In "Adventures in the Elements," it was revealed that he was the young student responsible for defeating the opposing school, and helping build Hexside, as shown in its information pamphlet. In "The First Day", Principal Bump is shown to place the students in a classroom after discontinuing the Choosy Hat, as it kept eating the students. Any students that he catches trying to learn something other than their assigned magic get reassigned to the Detention Track. At the end of the episode however, he became more accepting of the other students' desire to learn more than one magic type after Luz and her new friends, the Detention Track Students, saved the school from a deadly Greater Basilisk, who tried to consume all the magic from the staff and students, thanks to their mixed magic skills. Since that day, he made it official that students now have the choice to learn more than one magic type. When Emperor Belos announced his intent to have Eda face the irreversible petrification, Bump was among the people who voiced his disapproval, claiming that she helped him regain his love of teaching after she left Hexside.  In season two, it is shown that Bump openly enjoys Luz's presence at the school but is forced by the Blights, who are a powerful family, to have her, Gus, and Willow expelled. Contrary to them, Bump is severely saddened by this. When the kids attempt to get back into school, it brings him no joy to prevent them from entering. It is shown in the kids third attempt to get inside the school that he thought that life was so dull without them. In "Hunting Palismen" it is revealed that the devil "hat" on his head is actually his palisman named Frewin, which allows him to see, due to some undefined incident in his youth. When Frewin isn't on his head, Bump is shown to have long, black hair, a scar on his right eye, and a closed left eye. In "Them's The Breaks Kid", it is shown that Bump used to be Hexside's vice-principal where he worked under the more heinous principal Faust. They clashed with the ideals of their students. When Adrian Graye and the Emperor's Coven raid Hexside to force all the students into joining the Emperor's Coven, Bump is among the teachers and students that take refuge in the Healing Track's homeroom. After the students defeat Graye and the Emperor's Coven, Bump gets them to leave by stating that he would tell Emperor Belos that they were defeated by children. He is captured by the Collector after the events of "King's Tide"  and the remaining Hexside students create a statue in his honor, though it inexplicably depicts him skateboarding.

Camila Noceda
Camila Noceda (voiced by Elizabeth Grullon) is Luz's widow mother who sends her to summer camp to curb her overactive imagination, unaware of her daughter being on the Boiling Isles as she remained in contact via text messages for the first season. She also received letters from Vee, who posed as Luz during summer camp and lives with her soon after. While Camila eventually discovers the truth and decides to look after Vee, she is heavily despondent over Luz staying on the Boiling Isles to the point of blaming herself for pushing Luz out of her life. In "Reaching Out", it is revealed that she and Luz would collect flowers in remembrance of her husband. She is later seen looking out at the night sky as one star shines brightly. In "King's Tide", she reunites with Luz and meets her friends when she returns home, having escaped the Collector into the Human Realm. In "Thanks to Them," after seeing Belos and accepting her daughter's new life, she resolves to join her and her friends back to the Demon Realm. It is later revealed that she was very similar to Luz when she was younger and sent Luz to camp in a misguided attempt to protect her from facing the same struggles. She is Dominican-American, with Sarah-Nicole Robles saying that she and Luz are a "refreshing representation of a real Hispanic family.

Antagonists

Emperor Belos
Emperor Belos (voiced by Matthew Rhys) is a mysterious and sinister masked man who is the ruler of the Boiling Isles and the most powerful magic user alive, whom the Emperor's Coven serve personally. He is later revealed to be Philip Wittebane (voiced by Alex Lawther), a human witch hunter who came to the Boiling Isles centuries ago alongside his brother Caleb, intending to destroy all of witchkind. This mindset let him to murder Caleb when he turned his back on their profession after falling in love with a witch named Evelyn before forming a pact with the Collector. Philip took on the identity of Belos to take over the Boiling Isles while using propaganda to ban "wild magic" and establish a system for witches to use their magic "the right way". This led to him establishing different Covens, where those who do not join are sentenced to irreversible petrification. Belos initially used technology as means to utilize magic while prolonging his life by feeding on palismen, granting him power while using mental effort to retain his human appearance. He also concealed his ailment by claiming it as a curse produced from wild magic. His goal is to invoke the Day of Unity, a convergence of the Human and Demon Realms that would purge wild magic through the current Coven heads he selected, although its true purpose is to drain all magic from the Boiling Isles, which will kill every witch and demon in the process and, in his eyes, 'save humanity from evil'.

Belos convinced Lilith to join the Emperor's Coven by offering to cure Eda, only to go back on his word while forcing Luz to give him the portal. Though Luz rigged the portal to be destroyed, Belos repairs it and eventually acquires a vial of Titan's Blood to power the portal. Belos also later purchases an entire army of Abomatons from the Blights to increase his forces for the Day of Unity, with Hunter noting that Belos dislikes anyone establishing an unauthorized private army. In "Yesterday's Lie", it is revealed in Vee's flashback that prior to the series premiere, Belos had the Basilisk race resurrected to study their ability to drain magic and personally oversaw the search for those that escaped. In "Follies at the Coven Day Parade", Belos reveals his face to all the denizens of Bonesborough while having Terra relay a message to Luz that they would meet again soon and he was looking forward to it. In "Elsewhere and Elsewhen", unaware of Belos's previous identity, Luz and Lilith travel back in time to meet Philip. Upon discovering he had tricked them in order to contact the Collector, Lilith punches him in the face for nearly getting her and Luz killed. In "Hollow Mind", Belos appears in a child-like form before Luz and Hunter when they unintentionally entered his mind, using them to subdue the souls of all the palismen he consumed before revealing that Hunter is a Grimwalker he plans to dispose for "betrayal." He also reveals his true identity as Philip to Luz, showing that he orchestrated events to maintain the bootstrap paradox Luz caused from her time travel that allowed him to acquire knowledge of the Day of Unity from the Collector. Belos' plans come to fruition as he reveals he never intended to free the Collector before Luz stops him from returning to the human world by branding him with a sigil in an attempt to force him to cancel the draining spell. However, while affected by the Day of Unity, it only causes Belos to lose control of his body as he mutates into a monstrous creature that nearly kills her and her friends. His body is obliterated when King frees the Collector, who immediately goes on to stop the draining spell, ruining centuries of planning. However, a fragment of Belos lands on Hunter as Luz's group flees the Boiling Isles and ends up in the dilapidated house within the Human Realm, living off various animals as a parasite and then possessing Hunter before leaving his body to escape back to the Demon Realm. He later possesses Raine’s puppet body and begins to influence the Collector.

Kikimora
Kikimora (voiced by Mela Lee) is Belos’ minion and essentially his secretary, often fighting people or occasionally just giving out orders. She rarely appears in season one, often simply contacting members of the Emperor's Coven via a FaceTime-like process. Her hair appears to be a hand clinging onto her head, though this is never specifically confirmed in the show. She wears a jacket that covers her mouth, but we do get a glimpse of her mouth in "Clouds on the Horizon", which shows us she has only two teeth.

In season two, Kikimora shows more of her ruthless side as she uses her dragon in an attempt to murder Hunter and take credit for his own mission of retrieving palismen. She fails when Hunter works with Luz to free the palismen and escape without her discovering their identities, but she notes that Hunter has an injury matching the one she inflicted on her attacker. Since then, she has considered Hunter to be her workplace arch-rival and seems hellbent on getting her revenge on him than actually helping Belos; causing her to become somewhat mentally unstable. Concerned for her job and well-being, she briefly teams up with Luz and her friends so that she can escape. Upon hearing that she might acquire a long-coveted promotion, she turns on them. Plant Coven head Terra Snapdragon reveals that she was testing her loyalty and that the promotion was real. However, Kikimora is disappointed to learn that the "promotion" was simply that Belos would allow her to live. She later dispatched the Emperor's Coven to raid the Owl House after he declared its residents wanted criminals. She is revealed to have been demoted to delivery girl for Belos at some point, kidnapping who she assumed "Hunter", but actually Luz posing as him through Gus's spell, in the hopes of being promoted to a better position. However, after being denied her promotion and learning the truth behind the Day of Unity, Kikimora helps King reach the Collector to get back at Belos. Following the Collector's takeover, Kikimora influences Boscha to rule the survivors with an iron fist in disguise under the alias "Miki," mainly so that she can get back at Luz and her friends when they return. Luz and her friends manage to convince Boscha and the rest of the school to turn on her, resulting in her defeat once again.

Odalia Blight
Odalia Blight (voiced by Rachael MacFarlane) is Amity's emotionally abusive and conservative mother who holds high standards for her, Emira, and Edric, having conditioned Amity into a candidate for the Emperor's Coven while willing to remove anyone she considers a bad influence from her daughter's life. She also runs Blight Industries, which produces abomination-based defense systems that only barely work. She used her position as head of Hexside's parent–creature association to have Luz, Willow and Gus expelled from Hexside, only to allow them back after Amity threatens to destroy her factory. Odalia is later revealed to be aware of the truth behind the Day of Unity, though she does not care what happens as long as she is rewarded with a life of royalty in the Human Realm. When Alador destroys her factory, Odalia flees. She is later seen as one of the only survivors of the Collector's takeover, begrudgingly answering to his every whim.

The Collector
The Collector (voiced by Fryda Wolff) is a child-like being of immense power who is the last of a race of self-titled beings from beyond the stars known as the Collectors, who abused his powers to preserve worlds while eliminating troublesome specimens. He is callous and destructive, but deeply fears loneliness and seems to genuinely despise his race's genocidal nature. The Collector was sealed away by King's father within a sphere placed in the In-Between World that separates the Human and Demon Realms, being responsible for trapping the Owl Beast within the curse scroll that Lilith purchased and establishing a Titan hunting cult as the Grand Huntsman. The Collector taught Belos the spell for the Day of Unity on the condition of being released with Belos as his playmate, apathetic to the deaths that result from it. However, when Belos goes back on his word, the Collector has King release him by agreeing to cancel the Day of Unity. Once freed, the Collector obliterates Belos with the intent of playing "Owl House" with everyone on the Boiling Isles while keeping King by his side because they "pinky swore", deconstructing the head of the Titan in order to create an "owl house". The Collector took King as his personal playmate while turning most of the town residents into puppets. Belos, in Raine’s puppet body, convinces the Collector that King is against him and that Luz and her friends will try to stop him.

Other antagonists
 Warden Wrath (voiced by Roger Craig Smith) – A monstrous and brutal demon who works as the prison warden at the Conformatorium where those who are different are imprisoned. He has a crush on Eda who has always managed to evade his capture. Despite his large, intimidating appearance, he is actually quite cowardly. It was later revealed that he got demoted for stealing everyone's lunches when interrogated by Eda about the Day of Unity.
 Adegast (voiced by Robin Atkin Downes) – An octopus-like puppeteer demon who preys on those who feel that they are special by using lifelike puppets. Among them include a kindly wizard (Adegast's default puppet), a cat named Chris (voiced by Arin Hanson), a fairy princess (voiced by Eden Riegel), and a handsome young man named Nevareth (voiced by Billy Kametz). He was shrunken down and eaten by Eda.
 Tibblet-Tibblie "Tibbles" Grimm Hammer III (voiced by Parvesh Cheena) – A pig-like capitalist demon who is a night market stand owner and con artist. Following his first appearance, he develops a grudge against the inhabitants of the Owl House and those associated with them. His schemes have somewhat devolved into selling petty human objects to witches.
 The Demon Hunters – A group of humanoids who hunt wild demons. They were first seen trying to catch a transformed Hooty in "Hooty's Moving Hassle". They later work as animal control officers as a way to make ends meet, where they tried to catch Eda's owl monster form.
 Patch (voiced by Kevin Michael Richardson) – The leader of the Demon Hunters who wears an eyepatch. He takes his job seriously, yet has trouble trying to keep his somewhat less intelligent associates under control. Patch's name was revealed through the closed captioning.
 Tom (voiced by Kevin Michael Richardson) – Another member of the Demon Hunters. He tries to come off bigger than what he is.
 Roselle and Dottie (voiced by Grey Griffin and Cissy Jones) – Two elder ladies who take in stray animals and pamper them until they are brainwashed. They despise all teenagers. 
 Piniet (voiced by André Sogliuzzo) – A lizard man-like publisher who accepts writers, but traps them in tiny cubes so that they can write content for him forever. He seemed to have becomes slightly softer when Tiny Nose shared her book with him titled "My Stowy".
 Merchant (voiced by Jake Green) – An unnamed demon scammer who tricks people into going into the forest on a wild-goose chase so he could steal their youth for himself. He tried to trick both Eda and Lilith, but got beaten up by them in the end.
 Greater Basilisk (voiced by April Stewart) – The Greater Basilisk is one of the Basilisks that Belos had resurrected to study her kind's ability to drain magic, only for her to escape captivity. The Great Basilisk poses as an inspector for the Emperor's Coven to sneak into schools so she can feed on the residents’ magic before being defeated by Luz and the Detention Track students when she infiltrated Hexside. The Emperor's Coven denied any knowledge of the Greater Basilisk posing as one of their inspectors, causing Principal Bump to file a complaint to them.
 Grometheus "Grom" – Known as the Fear Bringer, it is a monster underneath Hexside that assumes the form of someone's worst fear. Every year, a student must battle and defeat Grom to protect the school.
 Wortlop (voiced by Gary Anthony Williams) – A gremlin con artist who alongside his accomplices posed as a four-armed healing master where one gremlin pretended to be infected with boils. He scammed anyone who sought him out for cures like he did with Gwendolyn Clawthorne. When Luz's claim of Wortlop being a fraud is proven to be true, Gwendolyn drove them away in revenge.
 Jacob Hopkins (voiced by Roger Craig Smith) – A human conspiracy theorist who believes in demons and witches, but has a wildly skewed idea of what they want or what they do. Believing they want to harvest humans and suspecting that they came from Mars, he captures Vee and plans to dissect her, but Luz directs Camila to knock him out and rescue her. Sometime afterwards, he lost his job at the museum and is now seen as a laughingstock by the whole town.
 Titan Trappers - A group of people living beyond the Boiling Isles. They worship the Collector as "the Grand Huntsman" and dedicate their lives to slaying Titans.
 Bill (voiced by Chris Houghton) – The elderly leader of the Titan Trappers whose eardrums were damaged following an encounter with a Titan. Upon learning that King is a Titan, Bill attempted to kill him to earn the Collector's favor while being apathetic to the rest of his people.
 Tarak (voiced by Kevin Michael Richardson) – A Titan Trapper who was interested in King, assuming him to be the child of a fellow Titan Trapper. He wrote a letter to him which he asked Hooty to deliver, only for it to later get eaten by him when a bug got on it, which Hooty assumed was junk mail. While he did bond with King upon finally meeting him, he ultimately turned on him when he learned that he was a Titan.

Other characters
 Katya (voiced by Grey Griffin) – A witch in the Bard Coven who was put in the Conformatorium for writing fan fiction about vegetables falling in love. She reappears in "Eda's Requiem" where it is revealed that she is part of the BATS, then in "O Titan, Where Art Thou", where she has since joined the CATS.
 Tinella "Tiny Nose" Nosa (voiced by Dana Terrace) – A small round demon and conspiracy theorist with a thirst for destruction. She speaks with an unusual rhotacism with her r's replaced with w's. At the end of "Sense and Insensitivity", Tiny Nose gets a book published. However, she is also shown to be employed by Tibbles. She is physically based on her voice actress and series creator's self-caricature.
 Snaggleback (voiced by Arin Hanson) – A pink monkey-like creature with a spiky shell who is nervous and shy around others. King thought he was a ferocious monster. Upon seeing him in person, King learned the truth and had to rewrite the facts about him in his demon book. He sometimes takes part in social events such as acting like a disco ball for Grom.
 Steve (voiced by Alex Hirsch (Season 1)/Matt Chapman (Season 2 onwards)) – A former coven scout. When unmasked, he has a humanoid face with a horn growing from the right side of his forehead. While working under Belos, he had no qualms about being casual with the Owl House, particularly Lilith whom he is friends with. He begins to have doubts about joining the Coven as it has brought nothing but misery. Later, he acquires a motorcycle and meets up with King whom he bonds with before joining the rebellion against Belos.
 Morton (voiced by Shannon McKain) – A teenager who runs the elixir shop that Eda frequents. While he can be quite pathetic, he takes his job very seriously.
 Braxas (voiced by Kevin Locarro) – A young bipedal demon with a large mouth, no eyes, and a deep voice who is a visitor to the Bonesborough Library. He is revealed to be the son of Warden Wrath.
 Alador Blight (voiced by Jim Pirri) – Amity's aloof, henpecked, and inattentive father who holds her, Emira and Edric to high standards along with his wife. He creates various abominations for Blight Industries and appears to be put upon by his wife who is implied to abuse him somewhat. He is easily distracted by things such as butterflies, but is very observant as he realized that Luz, Willow and Gus have made Amity a much better witch than they could have possibly imagined, revealing he is much more empathetic and moral than his wife. In "Reaching Out", it is revealed that he was a Bonesborough Brawl champion. While trying to stop Amity from taking part in the fight, he learns that she never wanted to be part of the Emperor's Coven or any coven for that matter and comes to respect her. Alador eventually stands up to Odalia upon learning of the Day of Unity and discovered that she knew its true nature, siding with his daughter and her friends.
 Vee / Number 5 (voiced by Michaela Dietz) – A member of the basilisk race that Belos had resurrected to research their ability to absorb magic, which enables them to shapeshift. Vee escaped captivity and snuck into the human world while witnessing Luz's arrival to the Boiling Isles, assuming Luz's appearance and identity. While Vee has mixed feelings over Luz running away from a loving home, she was grateful of getting an opportunity to be loved while later accepted as family by Camila after she learns the truth. Following Luz's return to the human world, Vee altered her human appearance to differentiate herself from Luz while still similar enough to easily pass as a relative. 
 Perry Porter (voiced by Gary Anthony Williams) – Gus’ father who works as a reporter for BBN-HXN.
 Captain Salty (voiced by Steve Blum) – The captain of a ship that is secretly owned by the Emperor's Coven. He would later transport Luz and King to where King's supposed family resides. It was later mentioned that Captain Salty's crew took up employment elsewhere.
 Gilbert and Harvey Park (voiced by Matt Chapman and Eric Bauza) – Willow's fathers who loves her unconditionally. Harvey Park is dark skinned, seems to be overly protective, and has high expectations for her. Gilbert Park is lighter skinned, is more easy going, and aware of her adventurous outings.
 Jean-Luc – A strange amorphous creature that was stationed in a tower where Eda found King. He was at first considered antagonistic, but was later revealed to be just protecting King for an unknown purpose. He is only active while inside the tower and becomes inactive when outside of it.
 Gwendolyn "Gwen" Clawthorne (voiced by Deb Doetzer) – Eda and Lilith's mother who had high aspirations for her daughters until the curse split them apart. She was more attentive to Eda than Lilith when trying to find anyone who can cure Eda's curse which drove a wedge in their relationship and had unknowingly resorted to fake holistic practices to cure her daughter. She eventually realizes that she has not been a good mother and makes amends.
 Malphas (voiced by Fred Tatasciore) – Amity's boss at the Bonesborough Library. He takes on the appearance of a cold and intimidating spectral energy, but he is actually a very down to earth and somewhat matter-of-fact individual who cares about his job. His name and appearance take inspiration after the demon of the same name found in the Pseudomonarchia Daemonum. 
 Keeper of the Looking Glass Ruins (voiced by Christopher Swindle) – An unnamed old man who uses illusions. He is the eccentric guardian of the Looking Glass Ruins and sees great potential in Gus. After encountering him, Mattholomule remarks that he is "definitely a ghost."
 Amber (voiced by Kari Wahlgren) – The short tempered member of the BATS. She has pink skin and animal-like ears and takes to calling Eda her "mommy", apparently unaware that she was not being literal.
 Derwin (voiced by Zeno Robinson) – A member of the BATS. Based on his interactions, he seems close with Katya.
 Dell Clawthorne (voiced by Peter Gallagher) – Eda and Lilith's father and Gwen's husband. He is a very jovial person that Eda looked up to. In flashback, it is revealed that Eda accidentally wounded him during her cursed transformation. In "Elsewhere and Elsewhen", it is revealed that carving palismen is a Clawthorne family tradition, one he can no longer do because of tremors from his injuries. He has no negative feelings towards Eda and offers that she continue his line of work.
 Flora D'esplora (voiced by Eileen Galindo) – A "bad girl historian" and Lilith's former mentor when she was in the Emperor's Coven. Her name and appearance are both a reference to Dora the Explorer.
 Masha (voiced by Grey Griffin) is one of Vee's friends in the human realm who takes over the Gravesfield Historical Society. They are non-binary.

Hexside faculty members
Besides Principal Bump, the following are faculty members at Hexside School of Magic and Demonics:

 Professor Hermonculus (voiced by J.B. Blanc) - A teacher who is in charge of the students in the Abomination Track. He is often seen being carried by his own abomination.
 Hexside Guards (voiced by Dee Bradley Baker and Kevin Michael Richardson) - A group of unidentified creatures with upside-down skulls who work as the security guards of Hexside. They patrol the halls where they bust troublemakers upon smelling them and keep the order in Hexside.
 Faust (voiced by Eric Bauza) - A demon who roughly resembles a bull. He has the ability to shoot fire from his head, and is the predecessor to Principal Bump (who was originally his assistant). He is cruel and strict to a ridiculous degree, expelling students for inconsequential behavior like "chewing too loudly".

Hexside students
The following attend Hexside School of Magic and Demonics:

 Boscha (voiced by Eden Riegel) – A three-eyed witch and one of Amity's "friends" who is obsessed with Penstagram. She is part of the Potions Track. Unknown to Boscha, Amity only befriended her because their parents are acquaintances, and therefore Amity never liked Boscha from the start or acknowledged her as her true friend. She is very condescending and bullies others based on their magical prowess. Boscha is also the Grudgby captain of her school and was unwilling to let others see Willow as an accomplished witch. Since then, Boscha has become petty to the point that she begins craving attention, even from those she dislikes. She is hinted to have two mothers in the episode "Them's the Breaks, Kid" as there are two Hexside students who bear a resemblance to Boscha. Following the Collector's takeover, her friends get turned into puppets and she begins to rule the survivors in Hexside while being influenced by Kikimora. She is later revealed to be desperate to earn back Amity's friendship, but a stern talk from her convinces her to lead the school in turning on Kikimora.
 Emira "Em" and Edric "Ed" Blight (voiced by Erica Lindbeck and Ryan O'Flanagan) – Amity's older twin siblings and members of the illusion track. They are troublemakers who are always picking on her, no matter how far it goes or how much it hurts her, like when they tried to steal her diary to show it at school and show no real remorse for doing so. However, they do acknowledge whenever they have messed up and are willing to make it up to her while still retaining a teasing attitude. Edric fears being alone, while Emira fears being stuck with him forever. Just like Amity however, they hate being controlled by their parents and will do anything to pull pranks on them. They are also shown to become much more supportive of Amity and even showed awareness of their sister's attraction to Luz. In "Reaching Out", it is revealed that they wear concealment stones to hide their acne and puberty transitioning appearances. Furthermore, Edric begins to embrace wild magic, revealing that he is much more talented than he lets on. In "Labyrinth Runners", they join additional tracks in school, with Emira in healing and Edric in beast keeping and potions.
 Matt Tholomule, also called Matty or Mattholomule (voiced by Jorge Diaz) – Luz and Gus's new rival and part of the Construction Track. He originally attended Glandus High, where he was constantly in trouble by getting detention. Mattholomule eventually transferred to Hexside, becoming the new president of H.A.S. after Luz destroyed the detention room, which Gus took the blame for. In "Through the Looking Glass Ruins", it is revealed that while attending Glandus, he had been treated very poorly by the students there. After Gus is betrayed by his friends from Glandus, Mattholomule starts to feel guilty and helps him in getting back at his former classmates, thus becoming friends with him. However, he is shown to be employed by Tibbles, though he is most likely not getting paid. In "Labyrinth Runners", he is revealed to be also taking the illusions track. It is later revealed that his full name is actually "Matt Tholomule".
 Viney (voiced by Ally Maki) – A witch from the Detention Track who wished to study the Healing and Beast-Keeping Tracks. She joins Willow's Flyer Derby team, but her friendship with Jerbo is put in conflict when he joins the opposing team.
 Jerbo (voiced by Noah Galvin) – A witch from the Detention Track who wished to study the Plant and Abomination Tracks. His friendship with Viney is put into conflict when he accidentally joins the opposing Flying Derby team.
 Barcus – A human-faced dog from the Detention Track who wished to study the Oracle and Potion Tracks. Barcus mostly speaks in dog language.
 Amelia (voiced by Eden Riegel) – A witch and one of Boscha's friends. She is part of the Plant Track and is on Boscha's Grudgby team.
 Skara (voiced by Kimberly Brooks) – A witch and one of Boscha's friends. She is part of the Bard Track. While she can be bossy and mean, she does show a friendlier side and does not appear as malicious as the rest of Boscha's, formally Amity's, troupe. She has since become closer to Willow.
 Cat (voiced by Grey Griffin) – A witch and one of Boscha's friends. She is part of the Healing Track and is on Boscha's Grudgby team. In "Labyrinth Runners" she heals Willow's injured arm.
 Eileen (voiced by Kimberly Brooks) – A cycloptic student of the Biped Demon classification on the Potions Track. She is always running a stand and looks bored. She can "speak", but it is all muffled as she has no mouth due to her one eye taking up most of her head. Eileen is apparently interested in humans.
 Bo – A witch on the Healing Track. She is friends with Skara.
 Selene – A witch on the Oracle Track who is recognizable by her crescent moon-shaped head and single eyeball. She appears shy, but is friends with Boscha.

Glandus students
The following students attend Glandus High:

 Bria (voiced by Felicia Day) – A witch on the Construction Track. She has a perky and upbeat attitude that hides a passive-aggressive nature. She is the leader of her trio of friends and will do anything to advance her own magic.
 Gavin (voiced by Nik Dodani) – A witch on the Abomination Track. He is friendly, but hides his father issues as he wants to impress him.
 Angmar (voiced by Harvey Guillén) – A yellow cat-like demon witch on the Plant Track. He is laid back, but gets distracted by butterflies.

Palismen
Palismen are magical totems that sit on top of a witch's staff and act as their familiar. Each palisman is acquired by their witches through their educations at their respective magic schools. Among known palismen are:

 Bat Queen (voiced by Isabella Rossellini) – A large bat-like being who has children of her own and lives in a cave. She once asked Eda to look after them and was so pleased that she leaves them with a treasure chest and whistle. It is revealed that she is a palisman that was formerly owned by a giant and looks after other forgotten and broken palismen.
 Owlbert – Eda's small owl palisman. He is usually perched atop his place on her staff, but comes to life and moves about on his own. He was initially afraid of Luz after she accidentally cracked his head, but learned to forgive her. Owlbert was handmade by Eda.
 Lilith's palisman - A white raven or crow with blue eyes. It is almost always seen on top of her staff.
 Hawksley – Gwendolyn's hawk palisman.
 Clover – Willow's bee palisman that she acquires in "Hunting Palismen". She answers to Willow's "tender, yet tenacious" personality.
 Emmiline Bailey Marcostimo – Gus's blue chameleon palisman that he acquires in "Hunting Palismen". He answers Gus' want to be an ambassador to the human realm and re-establish contact with the giraffes, which Eda earlier mentioned were from their world.
 Frewin – Bump's small red devil palisman. He is usually perched up on Bump's head and over his eyes to help him see.
 Maya – Boscha's crab palisman that she acquires in "Hunting Palismen". She matches with her competitive spirit.
 Viney's palisman – Viney's Manticore palisman that she acquires in "Hunting Palismen". He answers her for wanting to open a veterinary clinic for mythical pets.
 Flapjack – Hunter's cardinal palisman introduced in "Hunting Palismen". He is a small one-eyed cardinal that initially hangs onto Luz for the majority of her adventure with Hunter. Following Hunter risking his job to save the palismen, he chooses him to be his owner, much to Hunter's confusion. He eventually embraces him in "Eclipse Lake". In "King's Tide" it is revealed that he originally belonged to Caleb, Philip Wittebane's brother. In "Thanks to Them", he is mortally wounded by a Belos-possessed Hunter, and after Belos leaves Hunter's body to retreat to the Demon Realm, Flapjack sacrifices his life to revive him.
 Ghost – Amity's cat palisman. She is based on Dana Terrace's real life cat with the same name.
 Stringbean – Luz's palisman, originally carved as a simple egg with the intention of letting the palisman choose what it wants its own form to be. It remains unhatched and unnamed for several episodes. In "For the Future", it responds to Luz's realization that her deepest desire is to be understood and hatches into the form of a "snake-shifter".

Coven Heads
The following are the heads of the different Covens:

 Raine Whispers (voiced by Avi Roque as an adult, Blu del Barrio as a young Raine) – The Head of the Bard Coven who is also Eda's childhood friend and romantic interest, before Eda pushed them away due to her curse. Raine leads a small team of rebels called the Bards Against the Throne, aka the BATS. They also suffer from stage fright despite being musically gifted. Raine later gets captured and is still needed for the Day of Unity. Raine is next seen to be apparently under the influence of a concoction brewed by Terra Snapdragon that makes them obedient to Belos and unable to recall their reunion with Eda, despite sympathizing with her. This is later revealed to be a ruse since Raine has the ability to alter drinks via whistling into them, working in secret with Darius to stop Belos while deciding not to involve Eda in their plan to keep her safe. After the Owl House residents join them, Raine renames their group the Covens Against the Throne (or CATS for short) which Darius did not agree on the name for. Raine had an illusion-disguised Eda take their place during their part of the Day of Unity with the Coven Heads. An Abomaton found them with Lilith and Hooty while Terra discovered that that Raine with them is not the real Raine. Raine was then positioned in their planned spot. Raine was nearly killed by the draining spell until the Collector deactivated it. Raine is Disney's first non-binary character.
 Darius Deamonne (voiced by Keston John) – The narcissistic Head of the Abomination Coven who can turn into an abomination, appearing less interested in the loyalty of those on the Boiling Isles. Darius also despises Alador Blight, whom he considers to be an Abomination hack in light of him being behind them. Darius was also a pupil of the previous Golden Guard, initially finding Hunter a nuisance before expressing respect towards the youth for opposing him to save the friends he made during his coven recruitment mission in Hexside. Darius is later revealed to secretly oppose Belos's plans alongside Eberwolf, joining forces with Raine after capturing them to maintain his cover. He appears as a member of the CATS, which Darius did not agree on the name for. When it comes to the Day of Unity, Darius takes part in his mission with the CATS where he, Eberwolf, and a disguised Eda partake in the Coven Head's part of the festival. Their plot was discovered by Terra Snapdragon when she figured it out and the three of them are subdued by the other Coven Heads with the real Raine having been brought in upon Lilith and Hooty's capture. Darius was nearly killed by the draining spell until the Collector deactivated it.
 Eberwolf (voiced by Kari Wahlgren) – The humanoid beast-like Head of the Beast Keeping Coven of indeterminate gender. They can become ferocious and display some child-like behavior. Eberwolf is also into Penstagram and has the username "RAISEDBYDIREWOLVES". They are later revealed to be working alongside Raine and Darius to take down Belos and stop the Day of Unity. When it comes to the Day of Unity, Darius takes part in their mission with the CATS where they, Darius, and a disguised Eda partake in the Coven Head's part of the festival. Their plot was discovered by Terra Snapdragon when she figured it out and the three of them are subdued by the other Coven Heads with the real Raine having been brought in upon Lilith and Hooty's capture. Eberwolf was nearly killed by the draining spell until the Collector deactivated it.
 Terra Snapdragon (voiced by Debra Wilson) – The intimidating and sadistic Head of the Plant Coven who has control of all plants, including a flower she uses to make tea for Raine to keep them in a foggy state of mind. She is not only in charge of keeping Raine from rebelling, but was assigned to test Kikimora's loyalty and is also shown to be loyal to Emperor Belos. When she found out that the Raine with them is not the real Raine, Terra had Adrian remove the illusion exposing that Eda had been posing as Raine. She and the other Coven Heads subdued Eda, Darius, and Eberwolf as an Abomaton brings the real Raine in. After the draining spell takes a hold over her, she is horrified to realize that her loyalty to Belos has been misplaced, nearly ending in her own demise and the mass-genocide of the witch race the entire time when the Collector stopped the spell. In "For the Future", she is forced to participate in the Collector's role play to avoid being turned into a puppet, but is transformed anyway due to her poor impression of Eda.
 Adrian Graye Vernworth (voiced by Noshir Dalal) – The mischievous and egotistical Head of the Illusionist Coven with a prehensile lion-like tail who tried to get all the Hexside students to have one coven before the Day of Unity. He then later tries to find the Looking Glass Graveyard by going through Gus' memories, but ends up getting trapped in his own memories and later knocked out and carried away by scouts who fled when Principal Bump threatened to mention that they were all defeated by children. When Terra Snapdragon finds out that the Raine with them during the Day of Unity was an impostor, she had Adrian remove the illusion exposing that Eda had been posing as Raine and helped to subdue Eda, Darius, and Eberwolf. Adrian was nearly killed by the draining spell before the Collector deactivated it.

References

The Owl House
Owl House
Owl House